Hugh Gibson may refer to:

 Hugh Gibson (American pioneer) (1741–1826) Pennsylvania pioneer who escaped after being captured by Lenape Indians
 Hugh Gibson (judge) (1918–1998), Texas judge
 Hugh S. Gibson (1883–1954), American diplomat
 Hugh Gibson, pastoralist who built the Glenample Homestead in Victoria, Australia